Paladins: Champions of the Realm is a 2018 free-to-play online hero shooter video game by Hi-Rez. The game was developed by Evil Mojo, an internal studio of Hi-Rez and was released on May 8, 2018 for Microsoft Windows, PlayStation 4, and Xbox One, followed by a Nintendo Switch version released on June 12, 2018.

Setting

Paladins takes place in a fantasy world called the Realm. A largely medieval world filled with elves, dwarves, dragons, and other fantasy races. In this world, there is a conflict between two factions; the Magistrate and the Resistance. The Magistrate serves as the ruling power of the Realm and wishes to keep it safe and peaceful by restricting the use of magic, largely in the form of magic crystals, which had been used by corrupt individuals to cause chaos and destruction. The Resistance meanwhile, despite the damage caused, believes crystals are too useful to be banned from the general public, leading to them coming together to fight the Magistrate. Many playable characters in the game belong to one of these two factions. 

However, there are many others that aren't part of either group, instead doing things by themselves, or being part of some of the numerous other factions with their goals, some notable ones being the "Abyss", a group of monsters from another dimension, the "Pyre", a group of beings with angelic designs that hate the Abyss, the "Thousand Hands Guild", a criminal empire, the "Darkness / Maw", a group of alien monsters that consume worlds, and several others.

Gameplay
Paladins is a team-based first-person shooter that focuses on two groups of five players each, who compete for combat-based goals. The game is set in colorful sci-fi fantasy maps, where each player chooses a champion that cannot be repeated in the same team and cannot be changed in the match. Each champion has their own weapons, skills and fighting style; in addition, they can be enhanced and personalized from a card and skin system. The interface of each player is very profitable and customizable, with avatars and customizable borders to symbolize the player's profile; titles when reaching mastery level 30 with a champion, among others.

Game Modes
There are different gameplay modes for Paladins:

Siege: The 'main' Paladins game mode, two teams of 5 race against each other to capture the map's central capture point and, if successful, push a payload that spawns from it to the enemy base. Each successful push or capture grants one point. Preventing the enemy team from pushing the payload also grants one point. Additionally, the team that captures the point will get a bonus of 300 credits. The first team to score four points wins the game. A team cannot score their fourth point on defense, however, meaning that the team must capture a point or push the payload to win.
Onslaught: Teams battle over a large combat area in an attempt to take point control and earn points. Along with holding an uncontested presence on the control point, slaying enemy players also scores points for the team, akin to a team deathmatch.
Team Deathmatch: A classic game mode in most first-person shooter games, where two teams fight against each other to score kills. The first team to score 40 kills wins the game.
Ranked: The same game mode as Siege, however when players are choosing a champion, each team can pick three champions to ban, which makes them unavailable for either team. Also, each team can see the opponent's champions that are picked and selected, and once a champion is picked by any player on a team, the other team cannot use that same champion.

Loadouts 
It is possible to customize the gameplay of the characters by unlocking talents (by leveling up) and by creating a deck with classic cards. Each champion has 3 talents. Each talent gives the champion a great advantage, but only one can be selected per game, they cannot stack. Each champion also has 16 classic cards (up to 5 cards can be used at the same time) that the player can use to build decks. Only one deck can be selected per game. Each card can be leveled up, from 1 to 5, which can be chosen by the player. Each deck must make 15 points in total.

Abilities 
Each champion has a basic attack and varying skills. It usually has 3 skills in addition to basic attack (two mouse clicks and 3 keyboard keys). These skills can also have related passive bonuses. In addition to these “classic” skills, each champion has an “Ultimate” skill that allows situations to be turned around. Each ultimate attack is unique and often very powerful. To be used, they must be charged (percentage) by dealing damage to opponents.

Currency 
The game has different currencies. Battle Pass XP for daily quests or in-game achievements, Crystals for purchase with real money, and Gold for leveling up, daily visits, quests or playing individual matches. Currencies can be used to purchase special items in the game.

Characters 
There are 58 characters or champions, which are divided into 4 roles

FRONT LINE
 Ash
 Atlas
 Azaan
 Barik
 Fernando
 Inara
 Khan
 Makoa
 Nyx
 Raum
 Ruckus
 Terminus
 Torvald
 Yagorath
DAMAGE
 Betty La Bomba
 Bomb King 
 Cassie
 Dredge
 Drogoz
 Imani
 Kasumi
 Kinessa
 Lian
 Octavia
 Saati
 Sha Lin
 Strix
 Tiberius
 Tyra
 Viktor
 Vivian
 Willo

SUPPORT
 Corvus
 Furia
 Grohk
 Grover
 Io
 Jenos
 Lillith
 Mal'Damba
 Pip
 Rei
 Seris
 Ying

FLANKER
 Androxus
 Buck
 Caspian
 Evie
 Koga
 Lex
 Maeve
 Moji 
 Skye
 Talus
 Vatu
 VII
 Vora
 Zhin

Development 

Paladins arose from the idea of making a sequel to Global Agenda, which focused on improving PvP game modes, it was initially announced in 2012 and scheduled for release in mid-2013. Later, the developers preferred to change the aesthetics of the game. setting it in a fantasy world and turning it into a first person game. At the time, the game was known as "Aurum", though it went by the codename "Chaos". However, despite the initial goal of a fantasy setting, everything about the game was constantly changing, with what was essentially a new game being created every single day; with the sci-fi theme of Hi-Rez's previous title, Global Agenda, additionally being experimented with, potentially almost even outright becoming a sequel to the game.

Eventually, the developers found an iteration they were satisfied with. However, according to the developers, before they could show off the game, Blizzard's highly anticipated new game, Overwatch, was shown off. The developers claim they were worried about being compared to Overwatch and initially planned to implement some changes to make Paladins different to avoid this, but according to the developers, internal testing indicated players enjoyed the current version of the game, causing them to stick with their original plan.

Release 
The game was officially announced for the first time as Paladins in early August 2015. The Paladins closed beta started on November 17, 2015. In the Open Beta, the game appeared on September 16, 2016 in the Steam Early Access program. Within a week of the Open Beta launch on Steam, the game had reached 800,000 downloads and was one of the top ten most played games on Steam.

In June 2018, one month after its official release (Open Beta), the game reached an average of 18,000 active players per day. In November 2016, the game had surpassed four million registered users, and in mid-May 2017, the developer announced that the game already had over eleven million registered users. During 2018, this number surpassed between 30 and 35 million players. In March 2020, Hi-Rez reported that Paladins exceeded 40 million players. In December 2020, Paladins had seen over 45 million players.

Paladins Strike 
Paladins Strike is the mobile version of the game, launched in May 2018. In Paladins Strike, most of the characters from the original game are present, with all their abilities adapted to suit the canons of the MOBA genre. Here too, the game is based on 5 vs 5 battles. The fights are carried out in real time with an isometric top view. Paladins Strike is free-to-play: the game relies on micro-transactions and in-app purchases.

Realm Royale 
Realm Royale is the third-person shooter battle royale game version of the game, launched in June 2018 via Steam's early access program. In January 2018, Hi-Rez decided to give Paladins a corresponding mode named Paladins: Battlegrounds. Later, the mode became its own game, called Realm Royale. The game is free-to-play, integrating micro-transactions and in-app purchases.

Esports 
Paladins is a title that was played as an esport. The Paladins Premier League (PPL) was founded in cooperation between the developer studio and the WESA. This promises the participating e-athletes a fixed salary and support from the clubs.

On August 1, 2017, the Paladins Global Series started, which is a community tournament with prizes worth 350,000 US dollars. It was announced at DreamHack in Valencia. The event was the largest community esports tournament in the world. Regional PC tournaments are held every month and players from Southeast Asia, Russia, North America, Brazil, Latin America, Europe and Oceania can take part. Open bracket tournaments are held in the first 3 weeks of each month, where the amateurs can prove themselves and qualify for the monthly tournament. The actual Global Series starts on August 1 and runs for 10 months with monthly payouts. The events are then also broadcast on live stream services such as Twitch or Facebook.

Paladins now has an active esports scene with several major tournaments per year, such as World Championships and DreamHack competitions (as of December 2019).

Event 
Since 2020, Paladins hosts an annual event called the “Crystal Awards”, a user-voted awards ceremony designed to highlight the Paladins community. Four finalists are selected by Evil Mojo within several categories, while the community votes for one finalist for each award. Following this, Hi-Rez Studios announces the winners during the Paladins World Championship.

Reception 

The Microsoft Windows version of Paladins received "Generally favorable reviews" while the Nintendo Switch version received "Mixed or average reviews" according to review aggregator Metacritic.

IGN rated Paladins 8.4/10, stating "Working on top of the strong and fairly balanced foundation of a free-to-play hero shooter, Paladins’ capacity for experimentation is its greatest strength" and "Whether it’s the main mode that encapsulates the teamwork aspect or the character designs that immediately flow with creativity, Paladins: Champions of the Realm clearly stands out in the midst of competition". Gamereactor rated the game 7/10, praising the various characters, customization and maps, stating "Paladins might just win you over if you give it a try, and we'd definitely recommend you to do so". Canard PC gave Paladins 7/10, depicting it as a "competitive FPS" and complimenting the game despite the similarities between the game and Overwatch. Dan Lipscombe of Nintendo Insider rated the game 8/10, calling it an "overwhelming experience" and that "it’s fast-paced with solid shooting mechanics and although some of the champions are a little generic, it’s trying, which is more than others can say in the shooting genre". Common Sense Media gave the game 4/5 stars, describing it as a "Colorful multiplayer arena" that "offers frenetic team fun". Ric Cowley of Pocket Gamer gave 3.5/5 stars, explaining "Paladins is actually a pretty fun shooter. There's plenty of depth to it, and the wide pool of characters and abilities means everyone's tastes are catered for. But it all just feels a little bit off. It's trying so hard to be something that it's not, and it never doubles down on its own ideas or identity". GamesRadar+ complimented and defended Paladins about the similarities with Overwatch, declaring "Fast forward two years later, though, and Paladins is looking healthier than ever. Finally free from having to defend itself from those incessant comparisons, the game has come into its own as Hi-Rez Studios' fast paced development and eSports focused agenda has endowed it with an identity that stands apart from anything else on the market". Eurogamer praised the Nintendo Switch version, saying "Paladins has a great chance to shine here, and shine it does" and that "Overall, there's a lot to respect in how Paladins is represented on Switch. Hi-Rez has accomplished one of the closest matches to the other versions available, crafting a 60fps title where online competition with Xbox One players feels balanced and fair". Pat Kerley of The Republic of Players gave a positive review, depicting the gameplay as "fluid and responsive", calling the game "very consumer friendly" about the micro-transactions and stating "Paladins Champions of the Realm is a must buy game". PC Zone listed Paladins 2nd in their top "5 Best Free-to-Play Games on Steam in 2020", calling it "appealing". PlayStation LifeStyle listed the game in their top "7 Best PS4 Free-to-Play Games You Won’t Be Able to Stop Playing", indicating "This game gets a lot of flak for being called an Overwatch rip-off, but Paladins is better than that". CulturedVultures ranked Paladins 3rd in their list of the top "20 Best Free Games On Steam", declaring "Paladins: Champions of the Realm offers what Overwatch does without any fees: glorious and fun team battles with gun-toting and magic-wielding characters, each with a background story, in well-designed maps". TheGamer listed the game 9th in their top 10 "Free-To-Play Switch Games Actually Worth The Grind".

Controversies 
In response to accusations that the game is an Overwatch clone, Hi-Rez COO Todd Harris said that “While Overwatch is a fine game, it was not the inspiration for Paladins. Game development is an interactive process with ideas coming from many past projects. For the hero shooter genre, the game that deserves the most credit is Team Fortress 2. We released a TF2 inspired class-based shooter called Global Agenda way back in 2010. Paladins was conceived as a fantasy version of Global Agenda and of the approximately 85 combat abilities currently in Paladins, the vast majority are from the game Global Agenda we made 10 years ago".

In 2018, Hi-Rez Studios CEO Stew Chisam pointed out the similarities between Ash and Overwatch's last fighter Brigitte Lindholm, stating "If I happened to notice and point out any similarities between these two characters, would that make me the Pot calling the Kettle black, or the Kettle calling the Pot black? This will keep me up tonight unless I get a clear answer".

In an advertisement released in 2018, Paladins Strike used an artwork from Overwatch. Hi-Rez Studios' art director responded by stating "This art was created by a overseas partner studio for paladins strike and had not much in the way of oversight in its content creation by anyone internally at Hi-Rez. We will be looking into this immediately".

The loot boxes introduced in the game by an update were criticized by players, which could make the game too much pay to win. The game also received these allegations when it introduced a new in-game currency in a beta patch.

Awards

See also 
 Realm Royale – a spin-off of Paladins

References

External links

2018 video games
Early access video games
First-person shooter multiplayer online games
Free-to-play video games
MacOS games
Nintendo Switch games
PlayStation 4 games
PlayStation 4 Pro enhanced games
Video games developed in the United States
Windows games
Xbox One games
Unreal Engine games
Hero shooters
Video games containing battle passes